Madhavrao Bayaji Gaikwad (July 18, 1924 – November 12, 2018 ) was a freedom fighter and leader of Communist Party of India (CPI). He was a member of the Maharashtra Legislative Council from 1957-1962. He became the first Leader of Opposition in the Council and held the post from 1960 to 1962. He represented Manmad constituency from 1985 to 1990. He also headed the Manmad Municipal Council here in 1974 and fought for many years for the welfare of farmers.

References

1924 births
2018 deaths
Communist Party of India politicians from Maharashtra
Maharashtra MLAs 1960–1962
People from Nashik district